Edward Platt (born 26 March 1921 – 20 September 1996) was an English professional footballer who played as a goalkeeper.

Career
Born in Newcastle-under-Lyme, Platt spent his early career with Colchester United of the Southern League, before moving to Arsenal in 1938. Platt made his debut for Arsenal in 1946, and made a total of 53 appearances for them in the Football League. Arsenal won the old First Division in 1952-53 but, sharing goalkeeper duties with George Swindin and Jack Kelsey, he only made three league appearances all season. Platt also played for Portsmouth and Aldershot, before ending his career in non-league football with Worcester City.

He left Aldershot in November 1955.

References

1921 births
1996 deaths
English footballers
Colchester United F.C. players
Arsenal F.C. players
Portsmouth F.C. players
Aldershot F.C. players
Worcester City F.C. players
English Football League players
Association football goalkeepers